Mark Pegg is a British actor and film producer.

He first came to prominence as Detective Constable Tony Weir in the BBC production Our Friends in the North and has since appeared in many television and stage productions, including Frank Hauser's Chichester Festival Theatre's 1995 production of Hobson's Choice with Leo McKern. He trained at the Academy of Live and Recorded Arts in London.

In 2006, he produced the feature film Heroes and Villains which starred James Corden and Jenny Agutter, and in 2007 he was the Executive Producer on Stuart Urban's Tovarisch, I Am Not Dead.

As of September 2012, he was developing a number of film scripts at Elstree Studios

Mark is the patron of the Love Inspire Foundation.

In 2019, he opened an online acting school to enable students to study acting without the expense of attending drama school.

Filmography

Film

Television

References

External links 

Year of birth missing (living people)
Living people
British male television actors
British film producers
British male stage actors
Alumni of the Academy of Live and Recorded Arts